Associazione Calcio Dilettantistica Acicatena 1973 is an Italian association football club located in Aci Catena, Sicily. It currently plays in Promozione Sicilia. Its colors are white and red.

References 

Football clubs in Italy
Football clubs in Sicily
Association football clubs established in 1973
1973 establishments in Italy